DOR or Dor or DoR may refer to:

Computer games and characters
 Advance Wars: Days of Ruin, a turn-based tactics video game for the Nintendo DS
 Dor, a magician in the fictional Xanth universe; see Magicians of Xanth
 WWE Day of Reckoning, a Nintendo Gamecube video game

Geography
 Dör, a village in Hungary
 Dor, Iran, a village in Isfahan Province, Iran
 Dor, Israel, a moshav in northern Israel
 Ein Dor, a kibbutz in northern Israel
 Tel Dor, an archaeological site in Israel on the site of Dor or Dora, an ancient royal city of the Canaanites
 Dori Airport, an airport in Burkina Faso with the IATA code DOR
 Dorset, county in England, Chapman code

People

Given name
 Dor Bahadur Bista (born ca. 1924–1926), Nepalese anthropologist, social scientist and activist
 Dor Daniel (born 1982), Israeli singer songwriter
 Dor Elo (born 1993), Israeli football player 
 D'or Fischer (born 1981), American-Israeli basketball player
 Dor Guez (born ca. 1980), Israeli artist and scholar 
 Dor Hugi (born 1995), Israeli football player
 Dor Malul (born 1989), Israeli football player
 Dor Micha (born 1992), Israeli football player
 Dor Peretz (born 1995), Israeli football player

Surname
 Friðrik Dór (born 1988), Icelandic R&B and pop singer and songwriter
 Georges Dor (1931–2001), Québécois author, composer, playwright, singer, poet, translator, theatrical producer and director
 Gil Dor (born 1952), Israeli guitar player 
 Gisele Ben-Dor (born 1955), American Israeli orchestra conductor of Uruguayan origin
 Henri Dor (1835–1912), Swiss ophthalmologist
 Jacqueline Dor (1929–1972), French film actress
 Karin Dor (1936–2017), German actress
 Milo Dor (1923–2005), Serbian-Austrian author
 Oren Ben-Dor (fl. 2000s– ), professor of law and philosophy
 Rena Dor (1917–2000), Greek actress and a singer

Aliases
 Rod McKuen (born 1933), who used Dor as a stage name on some 1950s recordings

Science
 Deadly Orgone Radiation, a theory of Wilhelm Reich
 Delta-DOR, (or Δ-DOR for short), Differential One-Way Ranging, an interplanetary radio-tracking and navigation technique
 Diagnostic odds ratio, a statistical metric
 Dorado (constellation), from its standard astronomical abbreviation
 Dor procedure, a cardiac surgery treatment for hypertrophic obstructive cardiomyopathy
 Earth-boring dung beetle, or dor beetles, of the family Geotrupidae
 Delta-opioid receptors, a receptor that has enkephalins as its endogenous ligand
 Definition of Ready, a term in Scrum (software development)
 , a cultivar of Karuka
 Field biology acronym for Dead On the Road

Other
 Day of Remembrance (disambiguation)
 Department of Revenue (disambiguation)
 Directly Operated Railways, a holding company of the UK Department of Transport to run rail franchises that require public ownership
 Dor (political party), an Israeli pensioners' party
 D. Or. used in legal citations for United States District Court for the District of Oregon
Dance-oriented rock or dance-rock, a genre dance-infused rock music
 Dor (film), a Hindi film directed by Nagesh Kukunoor

See also
Dors, a surname